Stepan Alekseyevich Sherstnyov (born 3 June 2001) is a Russian football player.

Club career
He made his debut in the Russian Football National League for PFC Krylia Sovetov Samara on 17 October 2020 in a game against FC Volgar Astrakhan.

Personal life
His father Aleksei Sherstnyov is a football coach and a former player.

References

External links
 
 Profile by Russian Football National League

2001 births
Footballers from Moscow
Living people
Russian footballers
Association football midfielders
FC Strogino Moscow players
PFC Krylia Sovetov Samara players
Russian First League players
Russian Second League players
FC Nosta Novotroitsk players